The Rally Trans Itapua, is an international rally racing event based in the Itapúa Department in south-east Paraguay. The event is the opening round of the Codasur South American Rally Championship and a round of the Paraguayan Championship, the Campeonato Nacional Paraguayo.

The event was first run in 1981 and ran only briefly until 1983 as political instability swept Paraguay. Restart in 1989, the event has run continuously since then apart from a brief rest in 2004–05. The event became international in 2010 when it replaced the Rally de Encarnación as Paraguay's rally on the CODASUR championship. Paraguayan drivers have won every event, even after the influx of international drivers of recent years. In particular the Galanti brothers have dominated the event. Alejandro Galanti has won the event seven times between 1998 and 2012 while older brother Marquito Galanti has taken four wins. All eleven victories were in Toyotas, spanning Group A, WRC and most recently Super 2000 technical regulations cars. 2008 saw Paraguay's first CODASUR champion Victor Galeano win the event. In 2013 triple Codasur champion Gustavo Saba finally broke through for a popular win at his home event.

List of winners
Sourced in part from:

References

External links
Paraguayan Rally Championship Official website
CODASUR official website

Codasur South American Rally Championship
Rally competitions in Paraguay